Podalia annulipes is a moth of the family Megalopygidae. It was described by Jean Baptiste Boisduval in 1833. It is found in Brazil.

References

Moths described in 1833
Megalopygidae